Elizabeth Fagan   (born August 1957) is a Scottish businesswoman, chair of D2N2 Local Enterprise Partnership, and the former managing director of Boots UK.

Early life and education
She was born in August 1957, one of eleven children and grew up in Scotland. She has a degree in biochemistry, studying in Glasgow. 

In 2018, Fagan was given an honorary doctorate from Nottingham Trent University.

Career
After university, she taught chemistry from 1980 to 1983 at Scottish secondary schools.

Boots
From 2006 to 2007 she was managing director of Boots Opticians. She comes from the commercial side of the company, not the technical or pharmaceutical side.

It was announced that she would become managing director of Boots UK on 9 June 2016, taking over in July 2016.

She is the first female managing director of Boots UK. Seb James replaced her as managing director at Boots on 1 September 2018.

Fagan was appointed Commander of the Order of the British Empire (CBE) in the 2020 New Year Honours for services to gender equality in business.

D2N2 
In July 2018 Fagan was appointed chair of D2N2 Local Enterprise Partnership, an organisation tasked with stimulating economic growth across Derbyshire and Nottinghamshire.

References

1957 births
British retail chief executives
British women chief executives
British women business executives
Businesspeople in the pharmaceutical industry
Scottish chief executives
Living people
Commanders of the Order of the British Empire